Andreas Huss (born 15 October 1950) is a Swiss chess International Master (IM), Swiss Chess Championship winner (1983), Chess Olympiads individual medalist (1976, 1982).

Biography
From the begin 1970s to the mid-1990s, Andreas Huss was one of the leading Swiss chess players. In 1970/71, in Groningen he ranked 11th in 9th Niemeyer Chess Tournament. In 1983 Andreas Huss won Swiss Chess Championship.

Andreas Huss played for Switzerland and Switzerland-2 in the Chess Olympiads:
 In 1970, at first reserve board in the 19th Chess Olympiad in Siegen (+2, =3, -1),
 In 1976, at fourth board in the 22nd Chess Olympiad in Haifa (+5, =3, -2) and won individual silver medal,
 In 1978, at first reserve board in the 23rd Chess Olympiad in Buenos Aires (+3, =3, -3),
 In 1980, at third board in the 24th Chess Olympiad in La Valletta (+1, =2, -5),
 In 1982, at fourth board in the 25th Chess Olympiad in Lucerne (+6, =2, -2) and won individual bronze medal,
 In 1984, at first reserve board in the 26th Chess Olympiad in Thessaloniki (+3, =4, -3),
 In 1994, at second reserve board in the 31st Chess Olympiad in Moscow (+4, =3, -2).

Andreas Huss played for Switzerland in the European Team Chess Championship preliminaries:
 In 1977, at seventh board in the 6th European Team Chess Championship preliminaries (+2, =2, -0),
 In 1980, at sixth board in the 7th European Team Chess Championship preliminaries (+0, =2, -2),
 In 1983, at first reserve board in the 8th European Team Chess Championship preliminaries (+0, =3, -0).

Andreas Huss played for Switzerland in the World Student Team Chess Championships:
 In 1972, at third board in the 19th World Student Team Chess Championship in Graz (+4, =3, -4),
 In 1974, at first board in the 20th World Student Team Chess Championship in Teesside (+4, =3, -4),
 In 1976, at second board in the 21st World Student Team Chess Championship in Caracas (+4, =2, -3).

Andreas Huss played for Switzerland in the Men's Chess Mitropa Cups:
 In 1977, at second board in the 2nd Chess Mitropa Cup in Bad Kohlgrub (+3, =2, -0) and won team silver and individual gold medals,
 In 1980, at third board in the 5th Chess Mitropa Cup in Rovinj (+1, =1, -3),
 In 1981, at fourth board in the 6th Chess Mitropa Cup in Luxembourg (+5, =1, -0) and won team bronze and individual gold medals,
 In 1982, at fourth board in the 7th Chess Mitropa Cup in Bourgoin-Jallieu (+2, =1, -2),
 In 1983, at second board in the 8th Chess Mitropa Cup in Lienz (+1, =3, -1) and won team bronze medal,
 In 1984, at fourth board in the 9th Chess Mitropa Cup in Bad Lauterberg (+3, =2, -1),
 In 1987, at fourth board in the 11th Chess Mitropa Cup in Mürren (+1, =1, -2),
 In 1993, at fourth board in the 15th Chess Mitropa Cup in Bad Wörishofen (+1, =6, -2),
 In 1995, at second board in the 16th Chess Mitropa Cup in Bükfürdö (+2, =4, -0),
 In 2003, at reserve board in the 22nd Chess Mitropa Cup in Pula (+2, =2, -3),
 In 2008, at third board in the 27th Chess Mitropa Cup in Olbia (+1, =3, -3),
 In 2009, at third board in the 28th Chess Mitropa Cup in Rogaška Slatina (+0, =0, -6).

Andreas Huss played for Switzerland in the Clare Benedict Chess Cups:
 In 1974, at fourth board in the 21st Clare Benedict Chess Cup in Cala Galdana (+2, =0, -1) and won team bronze medal,
 In 1979, at fourth board in the 23rd Clare Benedict Chess Cup in Cleveland (+1, =3, -1).

In 1987, Andreas Huss was awarded the FIDE International Master (IM) title.

References

External links

Andreas Huss chess games at 365chess.com

1950 births
Living people
Swiss chess players
Chess International Masters
Chess Olympiad competitors